The New York Knights were an Arena Football League (AFL) team based in New York City. They played in the league for one season, 1988. They played their home games at Madison Square Garden. After going 2–10 overall in their only season the team ceased operations. The league then went several years before attempting to re-enter the nation's largest media market with the New York CityHawks.

History

The Knights became an expansion team of the Arena Football League in 1988. The team announced Jim Valek as the first coach in franchise history. The team featured a couple of players from the 1987 New York Giants replacement team, including starting quarterback Jim Crocicchia and his primary receiver Edwin Lovelady, but its desire to fans was questioned before the team began playing games. The Knights won their first game in franchise history, 60–52 over the Los Angeles Cobras. During the Knights home opener, fight erumped in the stands, and items were thrown on the field. After winning the season opener, the Knights lost 4 straight games before returning home to a smaller crowd, losing 22–36 to the Cobras. The Knights would lose 8 straight games before they defeated the Cobras 40–30 in Los Angeles. The team folded after a disappointing 2–8 season.

Notable players

Roster

All-Arena players
The following Knights players were named to All-Arena Teams:
WR/DB Vince Courville
OL/DL Quinton Knight

Head coaches

Season results

References

External links
 AFL Official Website

 
Defunct American football teams in New York City
1988 establishments in New York City
American football teams established in 1988
American football teams disestablished in 1988
1988 disestablishments in New York (state)